Eric Ravilious - Drawn to War, written and directed by Margy Kinmonth, is the first feature film to be made about War Artist Eric Ravilious. It features the voices of Freddie Fox, Tamsin Greig, Jeremy Irons and Harriet Walter and includes contributions from Ai Weiwei, Grayson Perry, Alan Bennett and Robert Macfarlane.

Director Margy Kinmonth is a BAFTA and RTS Award winner and known for such work as Naked Hollywood, Royal Paintbox and Revolution: New Art for a New World.

Production
Eric Ravilious - Drawn to War was filmed on location in UK, Ireland and Portugal.

Release
Eric Ravilious - Drawn to War, a Margy Kinmonth film, opened across the UK and Ireland on July 1, 2022, released by Dartmouth Films.

Awards
Nominated, The Master of Art Film Festival (2022)

Cast
 Freddie Fox
 Tamsin Greig
Neville Watchurst
Harriet Walter
Jeremy Irons
Samuel West

Reception 
Rachel Campbell-Johnston of The Times praises the film: "Ravishing Ravilious; a visionary who celebrated England in war and peace..."

The Observer headlines the film “…'Goodbye Darling': a poignant adieu of a doomed war artist.."

Tom Robey of The Telegraph rated to four out of five stars, commenting "Modest in its approach, this filmic portrait takes shape as both biography and love story."

References

External links 
  https://charlessaumarezsmith.com/2022/05/05/captain-ravilious/

2022 films
2022 documentary films
British documentary films
English-language films
Documentary films about visual artists
Eastbourne